Only Men Aloud! is the debut album by the choir Only Men Aloud!.

Track listing

Charts

Weekly charts

Year-end charts

Certifications

References

Only Men Aloud! albums
2008 debut albums